Krzekna is a river of Poland. It flows into Lake Będogoszcz, which is connected with Lake Miedwie by the Ostrowica Canal.

See also
Dobropolski Potok
Słoneczny Potok

References

Rivers of Poland
Rivers of West Pomeranian Voivodeship